Marian Kearns is a former camogie player, one of the stars of Antrim's 1956 All Ireland Camogie Championship winning team.

Career
She scored the winning goal for Antrim against Dublin in the 1956 All Ireland semi-final with what was described as "a magnificent cross-shot which caught the defence out of position and their goalkeeper unsighted." This put an end to Dublin's unbeaten run of nineteen years.

References

External links
 Camogie.ie Official Camogie Association Website
 Wikipedia List of Camogie players

Dublin camogie players
Year of birth missing
Possibly living people